Michael Joseph Teutul (born November 26, 1978) is an American television personality who appeared on the reality programs "Orange County Choppers" American Chopper and American Chopper: Senior vs. Junior.

Early life 
He is the youngest son of Paul Teutul Sr., the founder of Orange County Choppers, and his first wife, Paula Teutul. He is the younger brother of  Paul Teutul Jr., the chief fabricator on the show, and Daniel Teutul, the owner/general manager of Orange County Ironworks LLC.

At age 14, Teutul began working at his family's company, the Orange County Iron Works.

Career 
After Paul Sr. and Paul Jr. started Orange County Choppers, Teutul joined them as an assistant general manager. His duties involved answering phones and taking out the trash. On rare occasions, Teutul would help build choppers, at one point building his own bike. The family business became the basis for the American Chopper series. 

Teutul's role as part of the TV shows was to provide comic relief. Teutul frequently appeared at promotional events for the company. Teutul appeared on Late Show with David Letterman, Late Night with Conan O'Brien and The Tonight Show with Jay Leno. 

In December 2009 it was revealed on American Chopper that Michael Teutul had checked himself into a rehabilitation center to overcome an alcohol addiction.

Toward the end of the series, Teutul tried to mediate the ongoing disputes between Paul Sr. and Paul Jr. As revealed in season 6 episode 13, Michael was forced out of the business. Paul Sr. stated that Michael had many opportunities to be successful at OCC but never followed through on them. Michael joined Paul Jr. in his new business venture, Paul Jr. Designs.

Teutul's hobbies include painting and skeet shooting. In 2011 Teutul was attempting to market a line of gourmet pasta sauces under the moniker FarQueue Products, LLC. That same year he opened an art gallery titled Mikey Teutul's Wolfgang Gallery which closed in June 2013 due to declining sales.

References

External links 

1978 births
American Chopper
American television personalities
Living people
Motorcycle builders
Place of birth missing (living people)